The George Washington Colonials are the athletic teams of George Washington University of Washington, D.C. The Colonials compete in Division I of the National Collegiate Athletic Association (NCAA) as members of the Atlantic 10 Conference for most sports.

On June 15, 2022, the board of trustees announced that George Washington University would drop the "Colonials" nickname because it "no longer does the work that a moniker should—namely, unifying the campus behind our academic and athletic institutional aspirations." A new name is expected by the 2023–24 academic year.

Sports sponsored

Baseball 

The GW Colonials baseball team is a varsity intercollegiate athletic team of George Washington University. The team is a member of the Atlantic 10 Conference, which is part of the National Collegiate Athletic Association's Division I. The team plays its home games at Tucker Field in Barcroft Park, Arlington, Virginia. The Colonials are coached by Gregg Ritchie.

George Washington's first baseball team was fielded in 1891.

Men's basketball 

The GW Colonials men's basketball team plays its home games in the Charles E. Smith Center, which is also shared with other GW Colonials athletic programs. The team competes in the Atlantic 10 Conference. It qualified for the NCAA Division I men's basketball tournament in 2014 for the first time since 2007 and won the NIT Tournament Championship in 2016. The Colonials' head coach is Jamion Christian.

Soccer 

The GW Colonials men's soccer team competes in NCAA Division 1 Men's Soccer in the A10 (Atlantic 10 Conference) along with 13 other teams. The program began in 1967 and has earned two A10 Championships in 2002 and 2004 and two regular-season A10 titles in 1992 and 2011. The team made it to the NCAA Tournament 3 times, including the Round of Sweet 16 in 1989.

The GW Colonials men's soccer team has won the DC College Cup twice, in 2007 and 2008. The cup is a competition between four Washington, D.C. universities, including George Mason University, American University, and Howard University.

Women's gymnastics 
The women's gymnastics team is coached by Margie Foster Cunningham and assisted by both Barry Kistler and Jeff Richards. In the 2013–2014 season, the Colonials were led by senior captains Taylor Henderson, Kayla Carto, and Betsy Zander.

Men's and Women's Cross Country/Track and Field 
The Men's and Women's track and field program is coached by Terry Weir, and assisted by, Matthew Lange. George Washington competes in the Atlantic-10 conference. The Women's Cross Country team finished runner-up in the 2019 Atlantic 10 team championship. They have been represented at the NCAA National Championship five times since 2009: Megan Hogan twice in cross country (2009, 2010), Suzanne Dannheim in cross country (2019) and outdoor track (2019), Carter Day in outdoor track (2018), and Matthew Lange in outdoor track (2018).

Other sports 
The gymnastics team competes as a member of the East Atlantic Gymnastics League

The men's water polo team compete as members of the Mid-Atlantic Water Polo Conference.

Discontinued teams
In July 2020, George Washington University announced plans to drop seven sports to help offset an estimated $200 million budget shortfall amid economic fallout due to COVID-19. Three NCAA sports (men’s indoor track, men’s tennis and women’s water polo) and four non-NCAA sports (men’s rowing, men’s and women’s squash, and sailing) were discontinued.

Football

George Washington University's football program ran from 1881 to 1966.

GW ended the season with a 4–6 record (conference: 4–3) and Jim Camp was named Southern Conference Coach of the Year. On January 19, 1967, the Board of Trustees voted to end the football program. Poor game attendance and the expense of the program contributed to the decision. A former GW player, Harry Ledford, believed that most people were unwilling to commute into Washington, D.C., which did not have a metro rail at the time, on Friday nights to RFK Stadium. Additionally, Maryland and Virginia were nationally competitive teams that drew potential suburban spectators away from GW.

Facilities
Source

References

External links